Darnell Powell (born May 31, 1954) is a former American football running back. He played for the Buffalo Bills in 1976 and for the New York Jets in 1978.

References

1954 births
Living people
American football running backs
Chattanooga Mocs football players
Buffalo Bills players
Montreal Alouettes players
New York Jets players